Robert Joseph is a British wine expert, consultant, producer. In 1984, with Charles Metcalfe, he launched the magazine Wine International and the London International Wine Challenge. Joseph also launched International Wine Challenges in Asia (China, Japan, Vietnam, Singapore, Hong Kong, India) and Russia. He resigned as chairman of the International Wine Challenge in January 2006.

Biography
Joseph was the wine correspondent of the Sunday Telegraph for sixteen years, until 2001, and is the author of more than 28 books, twice winning the Glenfiddich award for wine writing.  He wrote an annual Robert Joseph Good Wine Guide (published by Dorling Kindersley) which in 2004 was named as best Wine Guide in the world by the Gourmand World Cookbook Awards. He has judged and/or chaired wine competitions in France, Portugal, Italy, Switzerland, Australia, New Zealand, South Africa, Chile, Portugal and the USA, He has been one of the members of the Grand Jury Européen, a Chevalier de Tastevin and a member of the Commanderie du Bontemps du Médoc et des Graves in Bordeaux. In 2006, he helped to launch  Meininger's Wine Business International magazine.

Robert Joseph regularly appears on television and radio in the UK and overseas to talk about wine. He is also a keynote public speaker at international wine trade conferences and events and hosts regular tastings for private groups.

In 2005, with former 'flying winemaker', Hugh Ryman and award-winning label-designer, Kevin Shaw, Joseph launched a wine brand in the Minervois region of Southern France called le Grand Noir with the aim of creating a range of French wines to compete with successful New World brands. There are now 15 wines selling nearly 3.8m bottles in 62 countries. A separate organic brand called Greener Planet was launched in 2008.

The le Grand Noir Chardonnay-Viognier was chosen to be listed by Gordon Ramsey's Savoy Grill in London in 2018/19  and the 2015 Minervois Reserve was named a Top 100 wine from the Sud de France 

As a strategic/marketing consultant, Joseph has worked for companies/organisations including Accolade wines, Concha y Toro, Torres, Origin Wines and the generic promotional bodies for Australia, Portugal, Brazil, Georgia and Moldova.

In 2019, he won the inaugural Born Digital / Vinventions Innovation Award 

His next book - to be published in 2023 is called Devilish Advocacy - a Personal Analysis of the last 50 Years of the Global Wine Industry

See also
List of wine personalities

Bibliography

 White Wines of France, 1987.  Salamander;, 
 Art of the Wine Guide, 1988.  Chartwell;, 
 Sunday Telegraph Good Wine Guide 1989, 1988.  Pan Macmillan;, 
 Essential Guide to Wine, 1989.  Joseph Stevenson;, 
 Sunday Telegraph Good Wine Guide 1990, 1989.  Pan Macmillan;, 
 Wines of the Americas, 1990.  Salamander;, 
 Sunday Telegraph Good Wine Guide 1991, 1990.  Pan Macmillan;, 
 Sunday Telegraph Good Wine Guide 1992, 1991.  Pan Macmillan;, 
 Sunday Telegraph Good Wine Guide 1993, 1992.  Pan Macmillan;, 
 Sunday Telegraph Good Wine Guide 1994, 1993.  Pan Macmillan;, 
 Sunday Telegraph Good Wine Guide 1995, 1994.  Pan Macmillan;, 
 Good Wine Guide 1996, 1995.  Pan Macmillan;, 
 Good Wine Guide 1998, 1997.  DK ADULT;, 
 Good Wine Guide 1999, 1998.  DK ADULT;, 
 Good Wine Guide 2000, 1999.  DK ADULT;, 
 Good Wine Guide 2001, 2000.  DK ADULT;, 
 Good Wine Guide 2002, 2001.  DK ADULT;, 
 Good Wine Guide 2003, 2002.  DK ADULT;, 
 Bordeaux and its Wines, 2004. Duncan Baird, 
 French Wines, 2005. Dorling Kindersley, 
 The Complete Encyclopedia of Wine, 2006. Carlton, 
 The Wine Travel Guide to the World, 2006. Footprint,

References

Footnotes

Year of birth missing (living people)
Living people
Wine critics